Juda Solomonovich Grossman (7 February 1883 – 6 June 1934) was a Ukrainian revolutionary anarchist, journalist and literary critic.

Biography
Juda Solomonovich Grossman was born into a Jewish merchant family in Kherson. At the age of 15 he became a Social Democrat and was arrested several times. Juda was influenced by his older brother Abram, who in 1897 formed the Elisavetgrad circle of the South Russian Workers' Union, which included uda. Abram and Juda were arrested in 1898. From 1899, Juda lived in the town of Novoukrainka and was under police surveillance. In the summer of 1902, Juda Grossman emigrated to Europe, where he established contacts with Russian emigrants - the Social Democrats.

In 1903, in London, he moved to an anarchist platform and joined an anarchist group led by Peter Kropotkin. In London, he contacted the Federation of Jewish Anarchists and published his articles in the newspaper of the Federation Freedom. He then moved onto Germany and Switzerland, where he collaborated with a group of anarcho-communists, was a member of the publishing group "Anarchy", defended the methods of terror and expropriation. In 1903, Grossman visited Geneva and joined the local group of anarcho-communist emigrants, Bread and Freedom.

Grossman gave lectures to revolutionaries and called for the beginning of revolutionary terror in Russia, to raise money for the revolution through expropriation. In 1904, he broke with the Kropotkin circle "Bread and Freedom", trying to forge his own direction in anarchism. At the end of 1904, returning from emigration to the Russian Empire, Grossman settled in Bialystok, where at that time a group of anarchist-terrorists "Bread and Freedom" was formed.

During the 1905 Russian Revolution, Grossman organized groups of the Black Banner in Odessa, Nikolaev, Yelisavetgrad, Ekaterinoslav and Kyiv. He published the illegal newspaper Black Flag, in which he called on revolutionaries to terrorize and to organize bloody riots against the government. He acted as a supporter of the revolt, which could be caused by total terror, and was an opponent of anarcho-communism. In the spring of 1906, Grossman traveled through the cities of Russia, organizing terrorist acts against the bourgeoisie. In early 1907, as the leader of the Black Banner group in Kyiv, he was elected a delegate to the International Anarchist Congress of Amsterdam. On 14 June 1907 he was arrested, brought to an inquiry, and held in Lukyanivska Prison. In 1908 he fled abroad again. From then on, he took the position of anarcho-syndicalism and advocated the unification of Russian anarchist groups into a single union. While exiled in Switzerland, he was the founder of the newspaper Rabochy Mir in 1914 and during 1915-1917 he edited the anarchist publication Rabochee Znamya.

Following the February Revolution, Grossman returned to Russia, where he became actively involved in anarchist agitation. He actively supported the Bolsheviks in the October Revolution, and in late 1917 - early 1918 organized the Bureau of Anarchists of the Donetsk Basin. In the summer of 1918 he took part in the Moscow Conference of Anarchists.

In early 1919, Grossman was one of the organizers of a group of "Soviet anarchists" who recognized the dictatorship of the Bolsheviks as necessary for the "transition period" to anarchism. In May 1919 he visited Huliaipole, where he tried to bring Nestor Makhno over to the platform of "Soviet anarchism." He then became a member of the headquarters of the Revolutionary Insurgent Army of Ukraine, worked in legal organizations of anarchists and in the anarchist publishing house Golos Truda.

Grossman withdrew from anarchist activity following the suppression of the left-wing opposition to Bolshevik rule. After that, he worked at the Russian Association of Proletarian Writers, published a number of works on the creative method of proletarian literature, polemicized with the theoretical opponents of the RAPP - with the Lefovites, Aleksandr Voronsky's group and others. In works of art he was mainly interested in their ideological side. During this time, he published a book of memoirs Thoughts of the Past (1924), a collection of articles The Artist and the Epoch (Moscow, 1928) and the book The Art of Changing the World (1929). In 1931-1934 he worked in the Methodology Sector of the Scientific Research Cinema and Photo Institute (NIKFI), published in the journal "Soviet Cinema".

Works

References

Bibliography 

 И. Гроссман-Рощин. К критике основ учения П. А. Кропоткина
 И. Гроссман-Рощин. О природе действенного слова
 И. Гроссман-Рощин. Социальный замысел футуризма
 И. Гроссман-Рощин. Е. ПРЕОБРАЖЕНСКИЙ. «О морали и классовых нормах»
 Гроссман-Рощин Иуда Соломонович. Штрихи к портрету на сайте Российские социалисты и анархисты после Октября 1917 года

1883 births
1934 deaths
Ukrainian anarchists
Ukrainian Jews
Jewish anarchists
Russian revolutionaries
Anarcho-syndicalists
Soviet film critics
Ukrainian revolutionaries